Cool from the Wire is the major-label debut album from American hard rock band Dirty Looks. It was released in 1988 on Atlantic Records. It includes the song "Oh Ruby", that received airplay on rock stations. "It’s Not the Way You Rock" was used in the film Johnny Be Good, and appeared on its soundtrack. The album peaked #134 in Billboard 200.

Track listing

Personnel
 Gene Barnett – drums
 Matt Lane – assistant engineer
 Paul Lidel – guitar, background vocals
 Bob Ludwig – mastering
 Phil Magnotti – assistant engineer
 Max Norman – producer
 Henrik Ostergaard – guitar, lead vocals
 Jack Pyers – bass

References

1988 albums
Atlantic Records albums